The RWE Tower in Essen is the highest building in the Ruhr area, and one of the highest buildings in Germany. It is used by RWE AG. As it shows the cultural and industrial change of the region, it is an important landmark in Essen. The skyscraper was designed by Ingenhoven Architects.

References

External links 

RWE
Office buildings completed in 1996
Skyscrapers in Essen
Skyscraper office buildings in Germany